193 Squadron may refer to:

 193 Squadron (Israel)
 No. 193 Squadron RAF, United Kingdom
 193d Aero Squadron, Air Service, United States Army
 193d Special Operations Squadron, United States Air Force
 VF-193, United States Navy